Ivan Vladimirovich Maksimov (born 11 June 1995) is a Russian football midfielder.

Club career
He made his debut in the Russian Professional Football League for FC Anzhi-2 Makhachkala on 25 October 2014 in a game against FC Terek-2 Grozny.

He made his Russian Football National League debut for FC Tosno on 11 July 2015 in a game against FC Fakel Voronezh.

Personal life
His is the younger brother of footballer Ilya Maksimov.

References

External links
 Career summary by sportbox.ru

1995 births
Living people
Russian footballers
FC Tosno players
Association football midfielders
PFC Krylia Sovetov Samara players
FC Anzhi Makhachkala players
FC Tekstilshchik Ivanovo players
FC Volga Nizhny Novgorod players
FC Torpedo Vladimir players